Edgar Alejandro Rivera Morales (born 13 February 1991) is a Mexican athlete who specialize in the high jump. He represented his country at the Rio 2016 Olympic Games, the 2011 and 2013 World Championships without qualifying to the final. He finished fourth at the 2017 World Championships. He also competed in the World University Games Shenzhen 2011 and Kazan 2013, among other important meets representing his country (CAC Games 2014, PanAm Games 2011 and 2015, World Youth (2007) and World Junior (2008 and 2010) Championships.

He studied at the University of Arizona. His older brother, Luis Rivera, is a world-class long jumper.

Personal bests
He has personal bests of 2.31 metres outdoors (2021) and 2.30 metres indoors (2016). Both are the current national records.

Competition record

References

External links
 
 Tilastopaja biography

1991 births
Living people
Mexican male high jumpers
Sportspeople from Sonora
People from Agua Prieta
Athletes (track and field) at the 2011 Pan American Games
Athletes (track and field) at the 2015 Pan American Games
Athletes (track and field) at the 2016 Summer Olympics
Athletes (track and field) at the 2020 Summer Olympics
Athletes (track and field) at the 2019 Pan American Games
Pan American Games competitors for Mexico
Olympic athletes of Mexico
Competitors at the 2011 Summer Universiade
Competitors at the 2013 Summer Universiade